Eddie Kennedy (born 1960) is an Irish painter. He is a member of Aosdána, an elite Irish association of artists.

Early life
Kennedy was born in Thurles in 1960.

Career
Kennedy studied at Limerick School of Art and Design, exhibiting at the Douglas Hyde Gallery in 1982 and graduating in 1983. He also attended the University of Cincinnati, receiving his Master of Fine Arts in 1989. He is chiefly active in oil painting of landscapes and seascapes, on canvas and linen.

In 2017 he won a Pollock-Krasner Foundation award and was elected to Aosdána.

According to artist Randall Exon, "There is always a surprise in Eddie’s paintings, but the surprise is never provocative as much as it is evocative. Meaning is everywhere and in everything. It is the range of emotion and spirit that so impresses."

Personal life
Kennedy lives and works in Dublin and County Mayo.

References

External links

1960 births
Living people
Irish male painters
Aosdána members
Alumni of Limerick Institute of Technology
University of Cincinnati alumni
20th-century Irish painters
21st-century Irish painters
People from County Tipperary
Irish landscape painters
20th-century Irish male artists